Harriet Records was an American independent record label based out of Cambridge, Massachusetts. The label was founded by Harvard history professor Tim Alborn in 1989. The label was named for the children's book Harriet the Spy.  The majority of Harriet's releases were indie pop 7" vinyl singles, but eventually they started releasing full length CDs. Harriet gave a number of notable artists their start. John Darnielle, Wimp Factor 14, My Favorite,  Crayon, Six Cents and Natalie, Tullycraft, and The Magnetic Fields all released early records on Harriet. After forty-five singles and ten CDs Harriet shut its doors in 1998.

Discography
 1 High Risk Group - Flag (7") Nov 1989
 2 Fertile Virgin - Lucky Day (7") May 1990
 3 Linda Smith - Gorgeous Weather (7") May 1990
 4 Scarlet Drops - Sweet Happiness (7") Sep 1990
 5 Wimp Factor 14 - Train Song (7") Mar 1991
 6 High Risk Group - Daddy Rolex (7") Mar 1991
 7 The Magnetic Fields - 100,000 Fireflies (7") Sep 1991
 8 Pop Smear - Angel Talk (7") Sep 1991
 9 Crayon - Matchbox (7") Sep 1991
 10 Mecca Normal - How Many Now (7") Jan 1992
 11 Scarlet Drops - Cling (7") Jun 1992
 12 Crayon - Moominland (7") Jun 1992
 13 Pinky - I'm on the Inside (7") Aug 1992
 14 Six Cents and Natalie - Boyfriends (7") Aug 1992
 15 Wimp Factor 14 - Botch (7") Oct 1992
 16 High Risk Group - Pulsed (7") Oct 1992
 17 The Magnetic Fields - Long Vermont Roads (7") Dec 1992
 18 Lotus Eaters US - Falling (7") Feb 1993
 19 Crayon - The Snaptight Wars (7") Aug 1993
 20 Twig - Fall of Love (7") May 1993
 21 Ampersands - Postcards (7") Oct 1993
 22 The Extra Glenns - Infidelity (7") Nov 1993
 23 Wimp Factor 14 - Miracle Mile (7") Oct 1993
 24 Bagpipe Operation - Mt. Lavaty (7") Mar 1994
 25 Pest - Philosophically Dyslexic (7") Mar 1994
 26 Lotus Eaters US - Too Late (7") May 1994
 27 Split-Release - Harriet Split Single (7") May 1994
 29 Vehicle Flips - Our Returning Champion (7") Nov 1994
 29 My Pretty Finger - A Season of Light (7") May 1995
 30 Tullycraft - True Blue (7") May 1995
 31 The Receptionists - Keep Your Secrets (7") Jul 1995
 33 Hula Boy - January 17, 1912 (7") Jul 1995
 34 Ampersands - Annabel Bleach (7") Nov 1996
 35 My Favorite - The Informers And Us (7")
 36 Prickly - Fancy Party Hairdo (7") Apr 1996
 37 Caramel - My Tailor Is Rich (7") 1996
 38 Vehicle Flips - Terminus (7") 1997
 39 Orans - Windfall (7") 1997
 40 Split-Release - Tullycraft / Rizzo (7") 1997
 41 Tokidoki - News Days (7") 1997
 42 Split-Release - My Favorite / Mad Planets (7") 1998
 43 Pest 5000 - Page 43 (7") 1998
 44 Shy Camp - Call in Sick (7") 1998
 45 The Cannanes - A Fine Line between Pleasure and Pain (7") 1998
 SPY 1 Wimp Factor 14 - Ankle Deep (CD) Aug 1993
 SPY 2 Crayon - Brick Factory (CD) Mar 1994
 SPY 3 Various Artists - The Long Secret (CD) Jan 1995
 SPY 4 Vehicle Flips - In Action (CD) Sep 1995
 SPY 5 Tullycraft - Old Traditions, New Standards (CD)(LP on Little Teddy Recordings) 1996
 SPY 6 Prickly - Velleity (CD) 1997
 SPY 7 Linda Smith - Preference: Selected Songs, 1987-1991 (CD) 1997
 SPY 8 Hula Boy - As Tight as an Owl (CD) 1997
 SPY 9 Musical Chairs - Wits' End (CD) 1998
 SPY 10 Various Artists - Friendly Society (CD) 1998

See also
 List of record labels

References

Record labels established in 1989
Record labels disestablished in 1998
American independent record labels
Indie pop record labels
Cambridge, Massachusetts
Record labels based in Massachusetts